Inquest is a 1931 British crime film directed by G.B. Samuelson and starring Campbell Gullan, Mary Glynne, Haddon Mason and Sidney Morgan. It was based on the play by Michael Barringer, which was adapted for film again in 1939.

Syopsis
In the film, a widow enlists the support of a King's Counsel to help clear herself of the accusation she had murdered her husband by a suspicious coroner.

Cast
	Mary Glynne as Margaret Hamilton 
	Campbell GullanNorman Dennison KC  
	Sidney Morgan as Coroner
 	Haddon Mason as Richard Hanning 
	G. H. Mulcaster as Charles Wyatt 
	Lena Halliday as Mrs Wyatt 
 Peter Coleman as Mr Hamilton  	
	Reginald Tippett as Mr Denton Hume

References

Bibliography
 Low, Rachael. Filmmaking in 1930s Britain. George Allen & Unwin, 1985.
 Wood, Linda. British Films, 1927-1939. British Film Institute, 1986.

External links

1931 films
1930s English-language films
British crime films
British films based on plays
1931 crime films
British black-and-white films
1930s British films